MT GDF Suez Neptune is a liquefied natural gas (LNG) carrier, which has been used as a floating storage and regasification unit (FSRU) for LNG at the Aliaga Etki LNG terminal in Aliağa district of İzmir Province, western Turkey between 2016 and 2019.

Characteristics
She was built by Samsung Heavy Industries in South Korea costing US$290 million. The vessel is owned by French multinational electric utility company GDF Suez. She was delivered to the Norwegian operator Leif Höegh & Co on November 30, 2009. The vessel is powered by four Wärtsilä dual-fuel-electric LNG engines of Finland, which drive fully integrated four ABB generators from Sweden.

Compared to standard LNG carriers, she has additional features such as three Wärtsilä-Hamworthy supplied regasification units mounted on skids, discharging arrangements, as well as special equipment for reducing emission to air and water. This allows to employ the vessel as a FSRU.

FSRU for Etki LNG terminal
The vessel sailed to Turkey after loading a full cargo at Montoir LNG Terminal in France, and took position at a special pier of Etki LNG terminal in Aliağa district of İzmir Province on December 11, 2016. French Engie (formerly GDF Suez) and Turkish construction companies Kolin and Kalyon inaugurated the Etki LNG terminal in Aliağa, where the FSRU went in service as Turkey's first floating liquified natural gas storage and regasification facility on December 23, 2016. In April 2019, she was replaced by FSRU Turquoise.

References

LNG tankers
Floating liquefied natural gas terminals
Ships built by Samsung Heavy Industries
2008 ships
Tankers of Norway
Energy infrastructure in Turkey
Natural gas in Turkey
Merchant ships of Norway